The Culcairn – Corowa railway line is a closed railway branch line in southern New South Wales, Australia. It branched off of the Main Southern railway line at Culcairn and headed south-west to the town of Corowa on the Murray River. The southern terminus was near the Victorian Railways Springhurst – Wahgunyah railway, but no bridge was ever provided over the river.

History
Construction was underway prior to 1891 with the line opening on 3 October 1892 and its main purpose was for the transport of wheat. Railway ballast was also carried along this line for use on the NSW rail network out of the 'Hurricane Hill' quarry siding. Passenger services ceased in 1975, a time when the widespread closure of country branch-line passenger services occurred. The section from Corowa to Brocklesby was decommissioned in January 1989; the last train (An XPT set known as 'The Federation Flyer') ran on that section on 24 January 1988. The section from Brocklesby to Culcairn was decommissioned in December 1991.

Current Status
The old tracks have not yet been removed from their original position but the line itself is in reasonable condition.

NSWSRA removed a majority of the station amenities following the mothballing of the line in 1991.

There has been renewed interest in reinstating the rail line as a heritage railway by the proposed Culcairn-Corowa Heritage Railway Assoc.

Further reading

See also
Rail transport in New South Wales

References

Railway line coords 

  Culcairn
  Burkitts Creek
  Red Creek
  Billabong
  Weeamera
  Hurricane Hill 
  Back Creek
  Petries Creek
  Walla Walla
  Burrumbuttock
  Orelda 
  Brocklesby
  Balldale
  Hopefield
  Corowa

Closed regional railway lines in New South Wales
Standard gauge railways in Australia
Railway lines opened in 1892
Railway lines closed in 1989